Kangaroo is a 2007 Indian Malayalam-language drama thriller film directed by Raj Babu and starring Prithviraj Sukumaran, Jayasurya and Kavya Madhavan. The screenplay was written by J. Pallassery from a story by Anil Raj. This film was an average hit in 2007.

Plot

Josekutty is a hard-working Knanaya Christian auto rickshaw driver from a good family. Josekutty falls in love with Jancy, whose sister Nancy is an unwed mother of a boy. Josekutty is asked to see Nancy for an arranged marriage, and he mistakenly thinks that Jansi is Nancy, and he agrees to the marriage. Josekutty agrees to marry her. Nancy is found dead on the day before the marriage. Josekutty raises her child as his son. He tries to find out who fathered Nancy's son. He learns that Monachan, who was the son of the manager in Nancy's home, was in love with her, and Monachan had killed her boyfriend, who was the father of her child. He accidentally killed Nancy. While trying to kill Josekutty and the child, Monachan is stabbed to death by Josekutty's brother Mathukutty and thereby saving Josekutty and the child. Josekutty and Jancy make up, and decide to take care of the orphaned child as their own.

Cast

Prithviraj Sukumaran as Joseph Abraham alias Josekutty 
Jayasurya as Mekkalattu Monachan
Kavya Madhavan as Jancy Mekkalattu, Stephen's sister and Josekutty's love interest 
Oviya as Susanna, Josekutty's and Maathukutty's younger sister
Kaveri as Nancy Mekkalattu, Stephen's and Jancy 's sister 
Lalu Alex as Mekkalattu Stephen 
Harisree Asokan as Pappachan
Jagathy Sreekumar as Mathew Abraham alias Maathukutty, Josekutty's and Susanna's elder brother 
Salim Kumar as 'Current' Kunjachan, Josekutty's, Susanna's and Maathukutty's brother-law
Suraj Venjaramood as Babychan 
Indrans as Chellappan 
Bindu Panicker as Annakutty, Josekutty's, Susanna's and Maathukutty's sister  
Kalaranjini as Cicily, Stephen's wife
Sukumari as Josekutty's, Susanna's and Maathukutty's Mother 
K. P. A. C. Lalitha as Stephen, Jancy and Nancy's Mother 
Sreejith Ravi as 'Syringe' Vasu 
Santhakumari as Janamma 
T. P. Madhavan as Paul K. Mani
Prajod Kalabhavan as Manmadhan

Soundtrack
Saji ram composed the soundtrack of "Kangaroo". Alex Paul composed background score and one song "mazhamani mukile". The lyrics are written by Biju kaipparedan and Vayalar Sarath Chandra Varma for one song "mazhamani mukile".

1. Aararirariraro - K. J. Yesudas

2. Marthoma Nanmayal - Afsal, Cicily, Anwar Sadat

3. Autokkaran Josoottikku - M. G. Sreekumar, Afsal, Anwar Sadat

4. Mazha Manimukile - Rimi Tomy, Vidhu Prathap

5. Oru Kana Kanavin - Vineeth Sreenivasan

6. Manathe Kanavinte - Anwar Sadat, Hannah

7. Aararirariraro - Ranjini Josh

Production
The film was initially discussed with Jayasurya in the lead role of Josekutty. For the film, he had to opt out from a role in Chotta Mumbai due to scheduling conflicts as per the original plan, but the project got delayed as it progressed and Jayasurya got interested in the role of Monichan and took that part, Prithviraj Sukumaran replaced him in the lead role.

Release
The film was released on 21 December 2007.

References

External links
 

2000s Malayalam-language films
2007 comedy films
2007 films